Ishwarlal Shankarlal Jain (b 21 May 1946,  Jamner, Jalgaon district), a politician from Nationalist Congress Party, is a Member of the Parliament of India representing Maharashtra in the Rajya Sabha, the upper house of the Indian Parliament. He is from Jamner, in Jalgaon district. His son Manish Jain is former MLC in maharashtra government on NCP ticket.

References

External links
Ishwarlal Shankarlal Jain- Rajya Sabha Profile 

Nationalist Congress Party politicians from Maharashtra
Indian National Congress politicians
Living people
Rajya Sabha members from Maharashtra
1946 births
People from Jalgaon district
Maharashtra MLAs 1978–1980
Indian National Congress politicians from Maharashtra